Gail Linda Rowat Bromley MBE, FLS (born 1950) is an English botanist who worked at Kew Gardens, initially as a taxonomist and then as Education development manager.

Education
Bromley went to Harrow County School for Girls and then obtained her first degree and Master of Science degree at the University of London.

Career
Bromley initially worked in the herbarium at Kew Gardens from 1975 on the Kew Record of Taxonomic Literature and then as a taxonomist, promoted in 1984 to Higher Scientific Officer, when she took part in an expedition to Brazil. In 1985 she moved to work in the gardens as a Guide Lecturer, in 1994 becoming  Head of Community Engagement and Volunteering, where she set up the adult education programme and established the volunteer programme.

After leaving Kew after 38 years she later worked for Botanic Gardens Conservation International as Biodiversity Education Officer on the BigPicnic project sponsored by Horizon 2020 and LearntoEngage project for the EU. She is a director of Botanic Garden Education Network (BGEN), Chief Education Officer for Historic Houses Association and Chair of the Board Of Trustees, National Heritage.

Recognition
Bromley was awarded an MBE for services to Education in the 2003 New Year Honours. She was elected a Fellow of the Linnean Society in 1987.

Personal life
She was born Gail Linda Rowat Hayes in Watford and married David Bromley in 1974.

References 

1950 births
Living people
British women botanists
Botanists active in Kew Gardens
People from Watford
Alumni of the University of London